Arikokaha (also spelled Arikikaha) is a town in north-central Ivory Coast. It is a sub-prefecture of Niakaramandougou Department in Hambol Region, Vallée du Bandama District.

Arikokaha was a commune until March 2012, when it became one of 1126 communes nationwide that were abolished.

In 2014, the population of the sub-prefecture of Arikokaha was 7,416.

Villages
The 5 villages of the sub-prefecture of Arikokaha and their population in 2014 are:
 Arikokaha (1 233)
 Badiokaha (1 374)
 Fononkaha (566)
 Nangoniékaha (3 099)
 Niangbo (1 144)

Notes

Sub-prefectures of Hambol
Former communes of Ivory Coast